Raphael Sassower (born 26 September 1955) is a professor of philosophy at the University of Colorado Colorado Springs (UCCS).  His academic contributions have been in the fields of economics, medical theory and methodology, science and technology, postmodernism, education, aesthetics, and Popperian philosophy. He is also a leader in the field of postmodern technoscience.

Education and career
Sassower was born and raised in Israel. He served as an officer in the Israeli army until he immigrated to the United States. He received his B.A. in Economics and Philosophy from Lake Forest College in 1980, and his Ph.D. in Philosophy from Boston University in 1985. While at Boston University he studied under Joseph Agassi.

He went on to spend his academic career at the University of Colorado Colorado Springs where he established and directed the Center for Arts and Humanities, and the Center for Women's Studies. He is the Director of the Center for Legal Studies and the Minor in Pre-Law, and has served as Chair of the Department of Philosophy. He was awarded the president's Teaching Scholar award in 2014, and is regarded as a public intellectual by his colleagues.

His thesis was on "What Gives Economics Scientific Status?  Methodological Transformation in Political Economy and its Pragmatic Consequences." Many of his research concerns are in regard to political economy, he is also contributes to the Colorado Springs Business Journal frequently. An ambitious entrepreneur he started multiple businesses bringing new life to downtown Colorado Springs.

Research contributions

Postmodern technoscience 
Postmodernism is not considered to be chronological, as something coming after modernism (post-modernism). Postmodernism is regarded as having a broader scope than modernism. It an interdisciplinary worldview which acknowledges the inherent contradictions of existence while allowing for a plurality of "truths".
Technoscience is a term coined to examine the intimate connection between the development of science and technology. This demands an ethical obligation for scientists to be accountable to the technological mishaps that stem from their development. The consequences of research become more relevant when science and technology are viewed as interconnected and as the engines of economic growth. The traditional, modernist view regards science as morally neutral and technology morally suspect in its application. Postmodern technoscience sees science as informing technology as much as technology informs science.

Works

Books
 The Quest for Prosperity: Reframing Political Economy. London: Rowman & Littlefield International, 2017.
 Democratic Problem-Solving: Dialogues in Social Epistemology with Justin Cruickshank. London: Rowman & Littlefield International, Forthcoming 2016.
 Compromising the Ideals of Science. Hampshire, UK: Palgrave Macmillan, 2015.
 The Price of Public Intellectuals. Hampshire, UK: Palgrave Macmillan, 2014.
 Religion and Sports in American Culture (with Jeff Scholes). London and New York: Routledge, 2014.
 Digital Exposure: Postmodern Postcapitalism. Hampshire, UK: Palgrave Macmillan, 2013.
 Solo: Postmodern Explorations. Lanham, Boulder, New York, and Oxford: Lexington Books/Rowman & Littlefield, 2011. 
 War Images: Fabricating Reality (with Louis Cicotello). Lanham, Boulder, New York, and Oxford: Lexington Books/Rowman & Littlefield, 2010. 
 Postcapitalism: Moving Beyond Ideology in Economic Crises. Boulder: Paradigm Publishers, 2009.
 Ethical Choices in Contemporary Medicine (with Mary Ann Cutter), London: Acumen Publishers and Montreal: McGill-Queen's University Press, 2007.
 Popper's Legacy: Rethinking Politics, Economics, and Science, London: Acumen Publishers and Montreal: McGill-Queen's University Press, 2006.
 Political Blind Spots: Reading the Ideology of Images (with Louis Cicotello), Lanham, Boulder, New York, and Oxford: Lexington Books/Rowman & Littlefield, 2006. 
 Confronting Disaster: An Existential Approach to Technoscience. Lanham, Boulder, New York, and Oxford: Lexington Books/Rowman & Littlefield, 2004.
 A Sanctuary of Their Own: Intellectual Refugees in the Academy. Lanham, Boulder, New York, and Oxford: Rowman & Littlefield, 2000.
 The Golden Avant-Garde: Idolatry, Commercialism, and Art (with Louis Cicotello). Charlottesville, VA: University Press of Virginia, 2000.
 Technoscientific Angst: Ethics and Responsibility. Minneapolis: University of Minnesota Press, 1997.
 Cultural Collisions: Postmodern Technoscience. New York: Routledge, 1995.
 Knowledge without Expertise: On the Status of Scientists. Albany, NY: SUNY Press, 1993. [Chosen as one of the Outstanding Books of 1993 by Choice.]
 Prescriptions: The Dissemination of Medical Authority (edited with Gayle L. Ormiston).  Westport, CT: Greenwood Press, 1990.
 Narrative Experiments: The Discursive Authority of Science and Technology (with Gayle L. Ormiston).  Minneapolis: University of Minnesota Press, 1989. 
 Philosophy of Economics: A Critique of Demarcation. Lanham, MD: University Press of America, 1985.  Revised PhD Dissertation: "What Gives Economics Scientific Status?  Methodological Transformation in Political Economy and its Pragmatic Consequences."

Selected publications
"A Bridge over Turbulent Waters: A Reply to Justin Cruickshank on Comparing Popper and Rorty," Social Epistemology Review and Reply Collective 3, no. 3 (2014): 57–59. 
"Virtual Reality and Mediated Immersion," Humanities and Technology Review Volume 31, Fall 2012, pp. 1–24.
"East Meets West: Beyond the Reach of the Law," The Image of the Outlaw in Literature, Media, and Society, Will Wright and Steven Kaplan (Eds.), Proceedings of the Society for the Interdisciplinary Study of Social Imagery, 2011, pp. 360–363.
 "Heroism as a Struggle between Reason and Desire," The Image of the Hero II, Will Wright and Steven Kaplan (Eds.), Proceedings of the Society for the Interdisciplinary Study of Social Imagery, 2010, pp. 87–92.
 "Postmodern Aesthetics: Manipulating War Images," in Tensions and Convergences: Technological and Aesthetical Transformation of Society, Marcus Stippak (Ed.), German Transcript Verlag, pp. 351–361, 2006.
 "Misplaced Pressure: Between Bondage and Rage at the University," Science Studies, Vol. 10, No. 2:23–34.
 "Pedagogy as Psychology: A View from Within," Critical Rationalism, the Social Sciences and the Humanities: Essays for Joseph Agassi, I.C. Jarvie and N. Laor (eds.), 1995, Vol. II, pp. 
 "A Conceptual Approach to Child Maltreatment" (with Michael A. Grodin, M.D.), Pediatrician: International Journal of Child and Adolescent Health 17:74–78, 1990.
 "Ethical Issues in AIDS Research" (with Michael A. Grodin, M.D. and Paula Kaminow, J.D.), Quality Review Bulletin: Journal of Quality Assurance 12:347‑352, 1986.
Revised and reprinted in New England Journal of Public Policy 4:215–225, 1988.
Reprinted in The AIDS Epidemic: Private Rights and the Public Interest, Padraig O'Malley (ed.), Boston: Beacon Press, 1989.

References

External links

University of Colorado Colorado Springs faculty
American philosophers
1955 births
Living people
Lake Forest College alumni
Boston University alumni
Israeli emigrants to the United States